The tenth series of the British medical drama television series Holby City commenced airing in the United Kingdom on BBC One on 16 October 2007, and concluded on 14 October 2008.

Episodes

Cast

Main characters 

Jane Asher as Anne-Marie, Lady Byrne (episodes 31–41)
Rakie Ayola as Kyla Tyson
Paul Bradley as Elliot Hope
Tom Chambers as Sam Strachan
Sharon D. Clarke as Lola Griffin (until episode 53)
Hari Dhillon as Michael Spence (from episode 6)

Rebecca Grant as Daisha Anderson (from episode 24)
Tina Hobley as Chrissie Williams (until episode 26)
Jaye Jacobs as Donna Jackson

Patsy Kensit as Faye Byrne
Nadine Lewington as Maddy Young
Rosie Marcel as Jac Naylor
Amanda Mealing as Connie Beauchamp
Duncan Pow as Linden Cullen (from episode 14)
Robert Powell as Mark Williams
Hugh Quarshie as Ric Griffin
Luke Roberts as Joseph Byrne
Phoebe Thomas as Maria Kendall

Recurring and guest characters 
Dominic Colchester as Jamie Norton (from episode 39)
Stella Gonet as Jayne Grayson
Andrew Lewis as Paul Rose
Alex Macqueen as Keith Greene
Conor Mullen as Stuart McElroy (episodes 4–18)
Sandra Voe as Elizabeth Mills (episode 53)

References

10
2007 British television seasons
2008 British television seasons